Coastin' is the seventh studio album by American reggae band Iration, released on July 10, 2020.

Track listing

CD Release

Charts

References

External links
Coastin'

2020 albums
Reggae albums by American artists